Kilanda Church is a church in Ale Municipality, about  east of the urban area of Älvängen, in Västergötland, Sweden. Since January 1, 2008 it has belonged to the Starrkärr-Kilanda parish in the Diocese of Gothenburg.

The small stone church dates from the 13th century. It was rebuilt in 1703 with stone, replacing the older wood. The baptismal font is from the 13th century and the pulpit from 1721. The ceiling paintings were added by Ditloff Ross in 1738–39. It was renovated in 1947-8 by the architect Sigfrid Ericson, who also designed the altarpiece in 1954. The renovation in 1948 gave the church an 18th-century character.

References

Churches in Västra Götaland County
Churches completed in 1703
18th-century Church of Sweden church buildings
1703 establishments in Sweden
Churches in the Diocese of Gothenburg